Jinja is a city in the Eastern Region of Uganda, located on the North shores of Lake Victoria.

Location
Jinja is in Jinja District, Busoga sub-region, in the Eastern Region of Uganda.

It sits along the northern shores of Lake Victoria, near the source of the White Nile.

History
The city was founded in 1901 by British settlers. 
It was planned under colonial rule in 1948 by Ernst May, German architect and urban planner. May also designed the urban planning scheme for Kampala, creating what he called "neighborhood units." Estates were built for the ruling elite in many parts outside the center city. This led to the area's 'slum clearance' which displaced more than 1,000 residents in the 1950s.

In 1954, the construction of the Owen Falls Dam submerged the Ripon Falls. Most of the "Flat Rocks" that gave the area its name disappeared under water as well. The local Baganda called the area "the stones" which is "Mayinja" in Luganda. The name "Jinja" is derived from this. A description of what the area looked like can be found in the notes of John Hanning Speke, the first European to lay eyes on the source of the Nile:

Though beautiful, the scene was not exactly what I expected, for the broad surface of the lake was shut out from view by a spur of hill, and the falls, about twelve feet deep and four to five hundred feet broad, were broken by rocks; still it was a sight that attracted one to it for hours. The roar of the waters, the thousands of passenger fish leaping at the falls with all their might, the fishermen coming out in boats, and taking post on all the rocks with rod and hook, hippopotami and crocodiles lying sleepily on the water, the ferry at work above the falls, and cattle driven down to drink at the margin of the lake, made in all, with the pretty nature of the country—small grassy-topped hills, with trees in the intervening valleys and on the lower slopes—as interesting a picture as one could wish to see."

Jinja was among the Ugandan cities affected by the Uganda–Tanzania War of 1978–1979. After the Fall of Kampala to the coalition of the Tanzania People's Defence Force (TPDF) and the Uganda National Liberation Army (UNLA), Ugandan President Idi Amin initially fled to Jinja. There, he attempted to rally remnants of the Uganda Army (UA). According to journalist Nelson Bwire Kapo, Amin even declared Jinja the new capital of Uganda, but soon fled to Arua and from there into exile. Parts of the local UA garrison belonging to the Eagle Colonel Gaddafi Battalion remained, drunkenly harassing and murdering local civilians, but most soldiers gradually deserted and fled Jinja. The TPDF and their UNLA allies assaulted Jinja on 22 April 1979, occupying the city after encountering little resistance. The remaining UA troops mostly fled, and Jinja's civilian residents greeted the TPDF-UNLA force with cheers. The operation was accompanied by some looting in the city. Following the end of hostilities, Tanzanian officers reportedly used Jinja as a hub to transport stolen goods from Uganda to Mwanza, including cars, tons of coffee, large amounts of gasoline, and war materiel.

Population during the 2000s
The national census of 2002 estimated Jinja's population to be 71,213 of which 36,325 were males and 34,888 were females. In 2010, the Uganda Bureau of Statistics (UBOS) estimated the population at 82,800. In 2011, UBOS estimated the population at 89,700. In 2014, the national population census put the population at 72,931 However, the Municipality Authority contested the recent census of 2014, saying it under-counted Jinja's population. According to the 2014 national population census data, Jinja is the largest metropolitan area in the Jinja District and the 14th-largest metropolis in the country.

The majority of the population are of Bantu origin. Lusoga is the main local language. Jinja has a large population of inhabitants who are defined as "working urban poor". The average annual household income is estimated at US $100.

Economy
Jinja has the second largest economy in Uganda. In the past, factories chose Jinja as their base because of the nearby electric power station at the Owen Falls Dam. Since the early 2000s, the economy of Jinja has picked up steadily. The main economic activities take place in the central business district.

A new market for fresh produce was completed during the fourth quarter of 2014. The facility can accommodate up to 4,500 vendors and cost US$13.7 million to construct, with a loan from the African Development Bank from 2011 until 2014.

The biggest local employer is the Kakira Sugar Works (KSW), a member of the Madhvani Group of companies. KSW is one of the largest sugar factories in East Africa, employing over 7,500. The factory burns bagasse byproducts from sugar manufacturing to generate 50 megawatts of electricity for internal use and sale to the national grid. Sugar cane cutting median wages are about UGX:1,000 per day.

The headquarters of Nile Breweries Limited are in Njeru, in Buyikwe district in central Uganda, near the Source of the Nile, from which the brewery has been drawing its water since 1956. Building of the brewery commenced in 1952 and was completed four years later. Bottles of Nile Beer, renamed Nile Special Lager, the company's flagship brand, were first consumed in 1956. In 2001, Nile Breweries Limited was fully acquired by South African Breweries.

MM Integrated Steel Uganda Limited is one of the leading manufacturers of steel in the region. It has completed a $47 million (Shs122 billion) plant to produce 50,000 tonnes of steel products a year and directly employs 1,800 people. The company has projected to invest US$600 million through 2018.

Bidco International Oil Refining Company maintains a palm oil factory in the city. The palm oil fruits come from Bidco's  plantation on Bugala Island in the Ssese Islands Archipelago, Kalangala District, in Lake Victoria. The factory in the islands crushes the fruit, and the crude palm oil is transported to Jinja for refining into edible oil and other products.

Kiira Motors Corporation, also known as the Kiira EV Project, a locally based startup car company, expects to set up the first car manufacturing facility in Uganda, based in Jinja. The Kiira EV Project received  of land at the Jinja Industrial and Business Park. Production is expected to start in 2018. The government of Uganda will provide funding to the initial production and setting up of a factory for the project.

Jinja city's strategic location at the source of River Nile with numerous power generating plants makes it ideal for industrialisation.

TOURISM, Jinja city is considered to be the tourism hub of Africa with numerous adventure activities for tourists such as, kayaking, watching games, traditional dances, sailing, native fights and tag of wars, horse riding, experience night life, bike riding, village walks, visit the museum, water rafting, visit Busoga Kingdom palace, camping, visiting the beaches, hiking mountains, fishing, food tasting, tubing the Nile, bungee jumping, sun bathing, trekking, swimming, water skiing, visiting forests, windsurfing, cabling, canoeing, cycling, tour sugarcane plantations and factories, visit Jinja city Port Pier, visit the source of river Nile, visit Makwanzi, Busowoko and Itanda waterfalls.

The tourism sector of Jinja city is booming with numerous hotels, guesthouses, resorts, pavilions,  restaurants, bars, coffee shops, night dance clubs, theatres, golf courses, illuminations, amusement centres, zoos, bathing pools, sliding centres, casinos, cinemas, recreational centres, with many more opening up in the city.

Education
The city also has several educational establishments including the following:

Universities and colleges
 Royal Academy of Art and Design 
 Eastern Campus of Makerere University
 Jinja Campus of the Makerere University Business School
 Jinja Campus of Busoga University
 Jinja Campus of Kampala University
 Nsaka University
 Civil Service College University
 International Institute of Health Sciences
 Jinja Vocational Institute
 YMCA College of Business
 Nile Vocational Institute
 JInja School of Nursing and Midwifery
 Hotel and Tourism Training Institute

 Jinja School of Ophthalmic Clinical Officers
 Medical Laboratory Technicians School, Jinja
 Pasty Helm Memorial Vocational Training Center

Military colleges
 Uganda Senior Command and Staff College
 Uganda Junior Staff College
 Uganda Non-Commissioned Officer Academy
 National Defence College, Uganda

Secondary schools
 Busoga College
 Jinja College
 Jinja Senior Secondary School
 Kiira College Butiki
 Wanyange Girls Secondary School
 Amazima School
 Holy Cross Schools
 Kakira Secondary School
 Lords Meade School
 Nakanyonyi Girls School
 Pilkington College Muguluka
 St. James' Secondary School, Jinja
 Bugembe Islamic Institute Secondary School.

Primary schools
 Galaxy International School-Jinja Campus
 Jinja Christian School
 Jinja Montessori Pre School
 Kiira International School
 Kiira Primary School
 Maggwa Crescent Primary School
 Riverside Academy
 Shilo Nile Star Nursery and Primary School
 Spire Road Primary School
 Victoria Nile Primary School
 Vic View Primary School
Naranbhai Road Primary School

Defense
The Qaddafi Barracks, an institution of the Uganda People's Defence Force (UPDF), are in Jinja. They are the location of the Uganda Junior Staff College, one of the about a dozen military schools in Uganda.

Electricity generation
In 1993, construction began on a second power station at the source of the White Nile; an extension of the original Nalubaale Power Station. The extension was completed in 2003, named the Kiira Power Station, and is capable of producing 200 megawatts of hydroelectric power at maximum utilization.

Transport

Jinja is a major station on the Uganda Railway and is a port for Lake Victoria ferries.

A bridge, known as the Source of the Nile Bridge, was built across the Nile, connecting the town of Njeru to Jinja. Construction started in 2013 and the completed structure was commissioned on 17 October 2018.

The Kampala–Jinja Highway connects Jinja with the capital.

Local attractions

Jinja is commonly regarded as "the adventure capital of East Africa" due to the very many activities in town that one could engage in, especially for tourists.

Local attractions include white-water rafting, the "Source of the Nile", and bungee jumping. The hydroelectric facility is providing 250 megawatts of electric power.

Since 2015, the city has hosted the Nyege Nyege Festival, at Discovery Beach in the suburb of Njeru in Buyikwe district approximately 20 minutes from the Jinja Central Business District. It is East Africa's largest electronic music festival.

Places of worship    

Among the places of worship, they are predominantly Christian churches and temples : Roman Catholic Diocese of Jinja (Catholic Church), Church of Uganda (Anglican Communion), Presbyterian Church in Uganda (World Communion of Reformed Churches), Baptist Union of Uganda (Baptist World Alliance), Assemblies of God. There are also Muslim mosques.

Sport

Jinja has two major football teams Bul FC and Gaddafi FC, both of whom play in the Ugandan Super League.

Notable people
Tarique Ghaffur, British police officer
 Zari Hassan, Ugandan Socialite, musician and businesswoman.

Geographic data
Jinja hosts the regional offices of the Uganda Red Cross Society, a humanitarian organization.

City status
On 1 July 2020, the government of Uganda awarded city status to about one half-a-dozen municipalities. Jinja was one of those localities. As part of the qualifications to become a city, Jinja expanded to include the former Jinja Municipality, Bugembe Town Council, Mafubira sub-county and Budondo sub-county. The estimated population of the new city, as of October 2020, is about 300,000.

In October 2020, the city mayor, Titus Kisambira, signed a memorandum of understanding, as an initial step in the establishment of sister cityhood with the city of Shenyang, in Liaoning Province, in China.

See also

 Jinja Hospital
 Jinja Airport
 Kiira Power Station
 List of birds in Jinja
 Nalubaale Power Station
 Bujagali Power Station
 Madhvani Group
 Njeru
 List of cities and towns in Uganda

Notes

  Great African Travellers, From Mungo Park to Livingstone and Stanley, The Project Gutenberg EBook of Great African Travellers, by W.H.G. Kingston (2007) (https://www.gutenberg.org/files/21391/21391-h/21391-h.htm).

References

References

External links

 Online Luganda Dictionary

Jinja District
 
Busoga
Populated places in Eastern Region, Uganda
Populated places on Lake Victoria
Cities in the Great Rift Valley
Populated places on the Nile
Palm oil production in Uganda
Ports and harbours of Uganda